Phorcys is a primordial sea god in Greek mythology.

Phorcys may also refer to:
Phorcys (Trojan War), a hero of the Trojan War
Phorcys (moon), a moon of 65489 Ceto
Phorcys dubei, an extinct genus and species of therapsid
Phorcys, a genus and species (Phorcys corylina) of fungus